Christiane of Saxe-Merseburg (1 June 1659 – 13 March 1679), was a German noblewoman member of the House of Wettin and by marriage Duchess of Saxe-Gotha-Altenburg.

Born in Merseburg, she was a child of Christian I, Duke of Saxe-Merseburg and his wife Christiana of Schleswig-Holstein-Sonderburg-Glücksburg.

Life
In Merseburg on 13 February 1677 Christiane married Duke Christian of Saxe-Gotha-Altenburg. Both belonged to the House of Wettin: she was a member of the Albertine line while her husband belonged to the Ernestine branch. The couple settled in Eisenberg at the Christianburg Castle.

Two years later, on 4 March 1679, she gave birth to a daughter, named Christiane after her and later wife of Philip Ernst, Duke of Schleswig-Holstein-Glücksburg; however, nine days later (13 March) she died of childbirth complications aged 19, probably from puerperal fever. She was buried in Merseburg Cathedral. In her honour, her husband build the Castle church of St. Trinity (German: Schlosskirche St. Trinitatis) in the Christianburg Castle.

Notes

References
Publications about Christiane of Saxe-Merseburg in: VD 17 [retrieved 28 September 2014].

|-

1659 births
1679 deaths
Christiane
Albertine branch
Deaths in childbirth
Daughters of monarchs